John Alexander French, VC (15 July 1914 – 4 September 1942) was an Australian recipient of the Victoria Cross, the highest award for gallantry in the face of the enemy that can be awarded to British and Commonwealth forces. French was one of 20 Australians to receive the award for their actions during the Second World War. He was killed in action fighting against the Japanese during the Battle of Milne Bay in September 1942 while serving with the 2/9th Battalion.

Early life
French was born on 15 July 1914 in Crows Nest, north of Toowoomba in Queensland. His parents were Lucy (née Donaldson) and Albert French. His father was a hairdresser who had moved to the Crows Nest area from Tenterfield, New South Wales, while his mother had originally come from Charleville, Queensland.

In his formative years, French had a reputation as a good sportsman, excelling particularly at rugby league. He was also known for his sense of fair play, with one of his childhood friends, Alf Blinco, recounting the story of how French had exonerated him when he had been falsely accused of stealing by finding the real perpetrators. At age six, French attended the Crows Nest State Primary School, continuing his schooling there until 1928 when he gained a scholarship to further his education by successfully passing a scholarship examination. After this, French attended the Toowoomba State High School and Toowoomba Technical College. In 1929, after completing his schooling, he joined his father's business, commencing an apprenticeship.

Second World War
After the outbreak of the Second World War, French enlisted in the Second Australian Imperial Force on 22 October 1939, the first in Crow's Nest to do so. As a Queenslander, French was posted to the 2/9th Battalion, the first infantry battalion raised in Queensland during the war. In early May 1940, after completing training at Redbank, Queensland, the 2/9th Battalion received orders to deploy overseas. Embarking upon the Mauritania, they sailed to the United Kingdom where the battalion formed part of an Australian contingent – part of the 6th Division – that were to help defend against a possible invasion following the fall of France. The invasion did not eventuate and in late 1940, the battalion – along with the rest of the 18th Brigade – were transferred to the Middle East. They reached Alexandria in late December and shortly after arrival, the battalion became part of the 7th Division.

In March 1941, the 2/9th took part in their first combat action, successfully capturing the Italian fort of Giarabub. The battalion then joined the garrison  at Tobruk as it was surrounded by German forces, taking part in several actions before being withdrawn in August. They briefly trained in Palestine before being sent to Syria, where they undertook garrison duties following the capitulation of Vichy French forces. French was promoted to corporal in December.

In early 1942, in response to the growing threat posed by Japan's entry into the war following the attacks on Pearl Harbor and Malaya, the 2/9th Battalion, along with the rest of the 7th Division, was brought back to Australia. At this time they were eventually granted seven days' leave, and French returned to Australia and Crow's Nest. This leave was the final time his family saw him alive. This was followed by further training as the Australian Army reorganised for jungle warfare, before the 2/9th were committed to the fighting against the Japanese in New Guinea.

Victoria Cross

In late August 1942, the 2/9th Battalion was deployed to the Milne Bay area of New Guinea. The Japanese were advancing south along the Kokoda Track and Allied intelligence had predicted an attack around Milne Bay. In early September, the battalion took part in heavy fighting after the Japanese landed a force to capture the Allied airfields situated there. It was during this fighting that French performed the deeds that led to him being awarded the Victoria Cross. The citation for French's VC award reads as follows:

The fighting around Milne Bay eventually resulted in Japanese withdrawal, and represented the first full-scale defeat of the Japanese on land during the war. Although French's Victoria Cross was gazetted first, his award was actually the second for actions on Australian territory (due to Papua New Guinea being under Australian Government jurisdiction), as Bruce Kingsbury received his VC for actions near Isurava on the Kokoda Track on 29 August 1942. French is buried at the Bomana War Cemetery at Port Moresby. He was survived by his fiancée Dulcie McCahon. Two of his brothers also served during the war: Eric in the Army and Gordon, who was killed in action in August 1943 in Europe, in the Royal Australian Air Force.

Legacy
The library at Crows Nest is called the John French V.C. Memorial Library.

The Corporal John Alexander 'Jack' French VC  Estate in Gaythorne, Brisbane is named in his honour.

The John French VC Bridge on the Toowoomba Range crossing was unveiled in September 2019.

Personal life 

French was a cousin (first cousin, once removed) of George Cross recipient Eric George Bailey.

Notes

References

Further reading

External links
 Corporal J.A. French in The Art of War exhibition at the UK National Archives
 Corporal J French (photo, brief details)
 World War II Nominal Roll

1914 births
1942 deaths
Military personnel from Queensland
Australian World War II recipients of the Victoria Cross
Australian Army personnel of World War II
Australian military personnel killed in World War II
People from the Darling Downs
People educated at Toowoomba State High School
Australian Army soldiers